152 (one hundred [and] fifty-two) is the natural number following 151 and preceding 153.

In mathematics
152 is the sum of four consecutive primes (31 + 37 + 41 + 43). It is a nontotient since there is no integer with 152 coprimes below it.

152 is a refactorable number since it is divisible by the total number of divisors it has, and in base 10 it is divisible by the sum of its digits, making it a Harshad number.

Recently, the smallest repunit probable prime in base 152 was found, it has 589570 digits.

The number of surface points on a 6*6*6 cube is 152.

In the military
 Focke-Wulf Ta 152 was a Luftwaffe high-altitude interceptor fighter aircraft during World War II
  was a United States Navy  during World War II
  was a United States Navy  during World War II
  was a United States Navy supply ship during World War II
  was a United States Navy  during World War II
  was a United States Navy  ship during World War II
  was a United States Navy  during World War II
  was a United States Navy  during World War II
 152.3 (5.9"), common medium artillery (and historically heavy tank destroyer) caliber utilized by Russia, China and former members of the Soviet Union, akin to the  155 mm standard caliber of NATO nations.

In transportation
 The Baade 152, the first German jet passenger airliner in 1958
 The Cessna 152 airplane
 Garuda Indonesia Flight 152 was an Indonesian flight from Jakarta to Medan that crashed on September 26, 1997
 London Buses route 152

In TV, radio, games and cinema
 The aviation-frequency radio exchange (pronounced one-fifty-two), as 152 is associated with the Cessna 152
 "NY152" AOL e-mail account use by Joe in the movie You've Got Mail

In other fields
152 is also:
 The year AD 152 or 152 BC
 152 AH is a year in the Islamic calendar that corresponds to 759 – 760 CE
 152 Atala is a dark type D main belt asteroid
 The atomic number of an element temporarily called Unpentbium
 Sonnet 152
 The Garmin GPS 152, produced in 2001
 The Xerox DocuMate 152 Sheetfed Scanner
 The number of whole millimeter “ticks” on a six-inch ruler

See also
 List of highways numbered 152
 United Nations Security Council Resolution 152
 United States Supreme Court cases, Volume 152
 Psalms 152–155

References

External links

 Oklahoma Highway 152

Integers